Andreas Wittwer (born 5 October 1990) is a Swiss professional footballer who plays as a left back.

Career statistics

References

External links
Player profile at football.ch

1990 births
Footballers from Bern
Living people
Swiss men's footballers
Switzerland under-21 international footballers
Swiss Super League players
Swiss Challenge League players
FC Thun players
FC St. Gallen players
Grasshopper Club Zürich players
FC Winterthur players
Association football defenders